Bienkotetrix is a genus of groundhoppers in the family Tetrigidae comprising, only a single species, Bienkotetrix tibetanus. As its name suggests, it occurs in Tibet.

Formerly included was Bienkotetrix transsylvanicus (now Tetrix transsylvanica).

References

Tetrigidae
Caelifera genera
Taxonomy articles created by Polbot
Taxobox binomials not recognized by IUCN
Monotypic Orthoptera genera